The Battle of Estancia de las Vacas took place on November 13, 1859 in the vicinity of Estancia Cows in the state of Querétaro, Mexico, between elements of the liberal army under General Santos Degollado and elements of the conservative army commanded by General Miguel Miramón during the Reform War. The conservatives inflicted a defeat despite being outnumbered two to one by the liberals.

References

1859 in Mexico
Conflicts in 1859
Reform War